A dam failure or dam burst is a catastrophic type of structural failure characterized by the sudden, rapid, and uncontrolled release of impounded water or the likelihood of such an uncontrolled release. Between the years 2000 and 2009 more than 200 notable dam failures happened worldwide.

A dam is a barrier across flowing water that obstructs, that directs or slows down the flow, often creating a reservoir, lake or impoundments. Most dams have a section called a spillway or weir over or through which water flows, either intermittently or continuously, and some have hydroelectric power generation systems installed.

Dams are considered "installations containing dangerous forces" under International humanitarian law due to the massive impact of a possible destruction on the civilian population and the environment. Dam failures are comparatively rare, but can cause immense damage and loss of life when they occur. In 1975 the failure of the Banqiao Reservoir Dam and other dams in Henan Province, China caused more casualties than any other dam failure in history. The disaster killed an estimated 171,000 people and 11 million people lost their homes.

Main causes of dam failures

Common causes of dam failure include:
 Sub-standard construction materials/techniques (Gleno Dam)
 Spillway design error (near failure of Glen Canyon Dam, Walnut Grove Dam)
Lowering of dam crest height, which reduces spillway flow (South Fork Dam)
 Geological instability caused by changes to water levels during filling or poor surveying (Malpasset Dam).
 Sliding of a mountain into the reservoir (Vajont Dam – not exactly a dam failure, but caused nearly the entire volume of the reservoir to be displaced and overtop the dam)
 Poor maintenance, especially of outlet pipes (Lawn Lake Dam, Val di Stava dam collapse)
 Extreme inflow (Shakidor Dam)
 Human, computer or design error (Buffalo Creek Flood, Dale Dike Reservoir, Taum Sauk pumped storage plant)
 Internal erosion or piping, especially in earthen dams (Teton Dam)
 Earthquakes
 Climate-driven landscape instability (Rock-ice avalanches, Permafrost landslides, Debris flows, Outburst floods from glacial lakes and landslide-dammed lakes)

Deliberate breaching 
A notable case of deliberate dam breaching was the British Royal Air Force Dambusters raid on Germany in World War II (codenamed "Operation Chastise"), in which six German dams were selected to be breached in order to impact German infrastructure and manufacturing and power capabilities deriving from the Ruhr and Eder rivers. This raid later became the basis for several films.

Attacks on dams were restricted in Article 56 of the 1977 Protocol I amendment to the Geneva Conventions. Dams may not be lawfully attacked "if such attack may cause the release of dangerous forces from the works or installations and consequent severe losses among the civilian population", unless "it is used for other than its normal function and in regular, significant and direct support of military operations and if such attack is the only feasible way to terminate such support". Similar provisions apply to other sources of "dangerous forces", such as nuclear power plants.

Other cases include the Chinese bombing of multiple dams during Typhoon Nina (1975) in an attempt to drain them before their reservoirs overflowed. The typhoon produced what is now considered a 1-in-2000 years flood, which few if any of these dams were designed to survive.

List of major dam failures

See also 
Dam safety
Dam removal
Grout curtain
List of hydroelectric power station failures
Structural integrity and failure

References

External links
A list of dam failures and incidents in the United States Dam Safety.org
Chronology of major tailings dam failures from 1960 WISE Uranium Project
Chanson, H. (2009) Application of the Method of Characteristics to the Dam Break Wave Problem Journal of Hydraulic Research, IAHR, Vol. 47, No. 1, pp. 41–49  (ISSN 0022-1686). Available as a pdf at 
Dam Failure and Flood Event Case History Compilation  Bureau of Reclamation
Mount Polley mine: Ex-engineers warned tailings pond 'getting large'
Floods from tailings dam failures

 
Technology hazards

pt:Barragem#Barragens fracassadas